Athyrium medium is a species of fern in the family Athyriaceae. It is found in Tristan da Cunha.  Its natural habitat is subantarctic shrubland.

References

medium
Least concern plants
Flora of Tristan da Cunha
Taxonomy articles created by Polbot